Richard James Gray (born 24 August 1989) is a Scotland international rugby union player, who plays for Glasgow Warriors. He previously played for Toulouse, Castres Olympique and Sale Sharks.

Gray is easily recognised on the pitch due to his height, standing at 6 ft 10 in, and his long, peroxide blond hairstyle. He is one of the tallest rugby players in Europe.

Club career
Gray played for provincial sides Glasgow Hawks and West of Scotland. He began his professional career at Glasgow Warriors in 2008, and was named in the Pro12 Dream Team at the end of the 2010/11 season.  It was announced in November 2011 that Gray would be leaving Glasgow Warriors at the end of the 2011–12 season, having agreed to sign for the Sale Sharks. In May 2013 it was announced that he would leave Sharks and had signed a three-year deal with French team Castres Olympique.

On 24 November 2015, Gray agreed a four-year deal with Top 14 rivals Toulouse from the 2016–17 season.

It was announced on 16 January 2020 that Gray would be returning to his original Glaswegian club, Glasgow Warriors, on a two-year deal from the 2020–21 season.

International career
A former Kelvinside Academy student, Gray has represented Scotland at every age group from under-17 through to the senior sides, winning his first cap as an international as a substitute in the 2010 Six Nations Championship match against France. His first international start came against New Zealand during the 2010 Autumn test series. He scored his first international try in a Six Nations game against Ireland in March 2012, where he smashed through Tommy Bowe and dummied a great pass against Rob Kearney. 
Gray's 2013 Six Nations got off to a good start with Scotland beating Italy and Ireland, but during the match against Wales at Murrayfield, Edinburgh, he was injured and taken off the field. It was later revealed that he pulled a hamstring and was taken off the pitch as a precaution.

Gray was selected for the 2013 British & Irish Lions tour to Australia, being the tallest on the tour. He played against Combined Country, Brumbies, Reds and Rebels, and went on to play a part in the final test against Australia, being part of a winning Lions series team.

References

External links
 
Sale Sharks profile
Magners League profile
profile at Scottish Rugby

1989 births
Living people
British & Irish Lions rugby union players from Scotland
Castres Olympique players
Expatriate rugby union players in France
Glasgow Warriors players
People educated at Kelvinside Academy
Rugby union players from Rutherglen
Rugby union locks
Sale Sharks players
Scotland international rugby union players
Scottish expatriate rugby union players
Scottish expatriate sportspeople in France
Scottish rugby union players
Stade Toulousain players
Stirling County RFC players
Glasgow Hawks players
West of Scotland FC players